This is a list of airports in the former Netherlands Antilles upon its dissolution in 2010, sorted by location.

The Netherlands Antilles were part of the Lesser Antilles and consisted of two groups of islands in the Caribbean Sea: Bonaire and Curaçao (off the Venezuelan coast), and Saba, Sint Eustatius and Sint Maarten (located southeast of the Virgin Islands). The islands formed an autonomous part of the Kingdom of the Netherlands until the dissolution of the Netherlands Antilles in 2010.



List

See also 

 List of airports by ICAO code: T#Netherlands Antilles
 List of airports in Aruba (part of the Netherlands Antilles until 1986)
 Transportation in the Netherlands Antilles
 Wikipedia: WikiProject Aviation/Airline destination lists: North America#Netherlands Antilles
 List of airports in Bonaire
 List of airports in Saba
 List of airports in Sint Eustatius

References 

Sources

Notes

External links 
 Lists of airports in the Netherlands Antilles:
 Great Circle Mapper
 Aircraft Charter World
 The Airport Guide
 World Aero Data
 A-Z World Airports
 FallingRain.com

Airports
Antilles
Netherlands Antilles
Netherlands Antilles